Rolle railway station is a railway station in the municipality of Rolle, in the Swiss canton of Vaud. It is an intermediate stop on the standard gauge Lausanne–Geneva line of Swiss Federal Railways.

Layout and connections 
Rolle has two  side platforms with two tracks ( 1–2). CarPostal Suisse operates bus services from the station.

Services 
 the following services stop at Rolle:

References

External links 
 
 

Railway stations in the canton of Vaud
Swiss Federal Railways stations